Latimer is a city in Franklin County, Iowa, United States. The population was 477 at the time of the 2020 census.

History
Latimer got its start in the year 1882, following construction of the Iowa Central railroad through that territory. It was named for its founder, J. F. Latimer.

Geography
Latimer is located at  (42.762896, -93.368873).

Demographics

2010 census
As of the census of 2010, there were 507 people, 210 households, and 136 families living in the city. The racial makeup of the city was 91.5% White, 0.2% African American, 0.4% Native American, 0.2% Asian, 7.3% from other races, and 0.4% from two or more races. Hispanic or Latino of any race were 20.1% of the population.

There were 210 households, of which 31.0% had children under the age of 18 living with them, 52.4% were married couples living together, 7.6% had a female householder with no husband present, 4.8% had a male householder with no wife present, and 35.2% were non-families. 32.9% of all households were made up of individuals, and 21% had someone living alone who was 65 years of age or older. The average household size was 2.41 and the average family size was 3.07.

The median age in the city was 38.8 years. 24.3% of residents were under the age of 18; 10.2% were between the ages of 18 and 24; 22.6% were from 25 to 44; 22.2% were from 45 to 64; and 20.5% were 65 years of age or older. The gender makeup of the city was 46.0% male and 54.0% female.

2000 census
As of the census of 2000, there were 535 people, 210 households, and 144 families living in the city. The racial makeup of the city was 87.29% White, 2.06% Native American, 9.35% from other races, and 1.31% from two or more races. Hispanic or Latino of any race were 17.57% of the population.

There were 210 households, out of which 29.0% had children under the age of 18 living with them, 61.0% were married couples living together, 5.2% had a female householder with no husband present, and 31.4% were non-families. 31.0% of all households were made up of individuals, and 22.4% had someone living alone who was 65 years of age or older. The average household size was 2.55 and the average family size was 3.15.

In the city, the population was spread out, with 26.4% under the age of 18, 6.5% from 18 to 24, 21.5% from 25 to 44, 17.0% from 45 to 64, and 28.6% who were 65 years of age or older. The median age was 42 years. For every 100 females, there were 88.4 males. For every 100 females age 18 and over, there were 87.6 males.

The median income for a household in the city was $29,028, and the median income for a family was $35,833. Males had a median income of $30,313 versus $21,042 for females. The per capita income for the city was $14,332. About 2.9% of families and 6.6% of the population were below the poverty line, including none of those under age 18 and 8.7% of those age 65 or over.

Education
The CAL Community School District operates public schools.

References

External links
 

Cities in Iowa
Cities in Franklin County, Iowa
Populated places established in 1882
1882 establishments in Iowa